Libby Davies  (born February 27, 1953) is a Canadian politician from British Columbia. She was the member of Parliament for Vancouver East from 1997 to 2015, House Leader for the New Democratic Party (NDP) from 2003 to 2011, and Deputy Leader of the party from 2007 until 2015 (alongside Thomas Mulcair under the leadership of Jack Layton and alongside Megan Leslie and David Christopherson after Mulcair became leader in 2012). Prior to entering federal politics, Davies helped found the Downtown Eastside Residents Association and served as a Vancouver city councillor from 1982 to 1993.

Early life and career
Davies was born in Aldershot, United Kingdom, on February 27, 1953, and immigrated to Canada in 1968 with her family. She moved to Vancouver, British Columbia in 1969. Before being elected to Parliament, she participated in many grass-roots political organizations in the Downtown Eastside area of Vancouver. She dropped out of university to help Bruce Eriksen found the Downtown Eastside Residents Association (DERA), an influential low-income housing advocacy group. She was instrumental in a campaign to save the Carnegie library, which was later converted into the Carnegie Community Centre serving low-income adults. From 1994–1997 Davies was employed by the Hospital Employees' Union.

For 24 years, Davies lived in a common-law relationship with Vancouver city councillor Bruce Eriksen, who died of cancer in 1997. They had a son, Lief. In 2001, Davies became the first female Canadian Member of Parliament to reveal that she was in a same-sex relationship.

Political career

Municipal politics
Davies' first experience in politics was serving on the Vancouver Parks Board for one term, 1980-82. She was elected to Vancouver City Council as a member of the Coalition of Progressive Electors (COPE) in 1982 and was re-elected in 1984, 1986, 1988, and 1990. She ran for Mayor of Vancouver with the backing of COPE in 1993, losing to Philip Owen.

Federal politics
Davies was first elected to parliament in 1997 and re-elected in 2000, 2004, 2006 and 2008 and 2011. Previously the NDP house leader and spokesperson for housing, homelessness and multiculturalism, she became the health critic in the shadow cabinet of Jack Layton upon the NDP's ascent to Official Opposition status. In parliament, she was a strong supporter of drug policy reform, specifically to halt the criminalization of drug users.

In 2005, during the parliamentary debate on same-sex marriage in Canada, Conservative MP Jason Kenney cited Davies' prior relationship with Eriksen as proof that marriage law does not discriminate against LGBT individuals, since a gay person can marry a member of the opposite sex. Davies, who was never formally married to Eriksen, joined other commentators in criticizing Kenney for playing politics with other parliamentarians' personal lives.

In December 2007, Davies received the Justice Gerald Le Dain Award for Achievement in the Field of Law. She was recognized for her "outstanding drug policy reform work" at the 2007 International Drug Policy Reform Conference, hosted by the Drug Policy Alliance and the Criminal Justice Policy Foundation.

In 2009, she was interviewed for the Beyond Gay: The Politics of Pride documentary on Gay Pride celebrations internationally.

Davies faced accusations of anti-semitism stemming from a June 5, 2010, interview in which she suggested that Israel has been occupied territory since 1948. She was criticized for her comments the next day in an Ottawa Citizen editorial. She responded to these criticisms in a letter to the Citizen, which was also posted on Davies' constituency website.

In 2011, it was announced that Davies would serve as health critic for the Official Opposition Shadow Cabinet, while continuing to serve in her role as deputy leader of the NDP.

Davies declined to stand as a candidate for the leadership of the New Democratic Party in 2012, citing her inability to speak French as a factor.

On December 12, 2014, Davies announced that she would retire from parliament at the 2015 general election after 18 years as a member of Parliament.

Post-politics

In December 2016, Davies was named a member of the Order of Canada. In 2019, she published the memoir Outside In: A Political Memoir.

References

External links 
 
 
 Hansard – Debate in which Davies came out

1953 births
Bisexual politicians
Bisexual women
Canadian LGBT Members of Parliament
Canadian memoirists
Women members of the House of Commons of Canada
Women municipal councillors in Canada
English emigrants to Canada
Canadian LGBT rights activists
LGBT memoirists
Canadian LGBT writers
Living people
Members of the House of Commons of Canada from British Columbia
Members of the Order of Canada
New Democratic Party MPs
Coalition of Progressive Electors councillors
Women in British Columbia politics
Writers from Vancouver
21st-century Canadian politicians
21st-century Canadian women politicians
21st-century Canadian women writers
21st-century Canadian non-fiction writers
21st-century memoirists
Canadian women memoirists
21st-century Canadian LGBT people